Petri Tuomi-Nikula (born   12 January 1951)  is a Finnish diplomat. He has been the Ambassador of Finland to Italy, Malta and San Marino from 2010 to 2015. Since the beginning of 2016, he has been the Finnish Ambassador to Hungary and Slovenia.

Tuomi-Nikula is a Master of Political Science from the University of Helsinki, specializing in political history. His spouse is Merja Tuomi-Nikula (née Pörhö), a specialist doctor in gynecology and childbirth. His brother is Jorma Tuomi-Nikula.

Career
From 2005 to 2010, Tuomi-Nikula was the Head of the Communications and Culture Department of at the Ministry for Foreign Affairs. He has served as a press and cultural officer in Finnish missions in Bonn, Vienna and London

He served as the Secretary General during the First EU Presidency of  Finland  from 1996 to 2000 and as Secretary General of the International Advisory Board from 1989 to 2000. He was Chairman of Finland Promotion Board  from  2005 to 2010 and has been a member of the  Country Brand Delegation led by Jorma Ollila.

In 1980 Tuomi-Nikula launched MTV3's Ten O'Clock news. Before that, he worked as a journalist at the Finnish News Agency and in the  Vaasa magazine. From 2000 to 2003 he served as the Communications and Marketing Director at the Fujitsu Finland.

Other positions
Tuomi-Nikula is a founding member of the Pro Opera Association and Chaired the Board the  Association in the 1990s. He has been Chairman of the Finnish Museum Association, a Member of the Savonlinna Opera Festival since 2009 and Chairman of the Board of the Funding Fund for Fulbright Scholarships in Finland 2005–2010.

References 

Ambassadors of Finland to Italy
Ambassadors of Finland to Malta
Ambassadors of Finland to San Marino
Ambassadors of Finland to Hungary
Ambassadors of Finland to Slovenia
1951 births
Finnish artists
Finnish business executives
Finnish journalists
Living people